Atlantic Wharf is a southern area of the city of Cardiff, Wales. It is primarily an area of new houses and apartments located on the west side of the disused Bute East Dock and to the east of Lloyd George Avenue. It also includes a number of refurbished dock warehouses, modern hotels, the Red Dragon Centre and Cardiff Council's County Hall. Atlantic Wharf lies in the Butetown electoral division of Cardiff and the Cardiff South and Penarth constituency for the UK Parliament and the Senedd.

History
The Bute East Dock (originally called the East Bute Dock) was constructed to ease pressure on the existing Bute Dock in the 1850s. It was opened by the 12-year-old Third Marquess of Bute on 14 September 1859. The new dock was 1,310 m in length and up to 152m wide. It was surrounded by railway sidings and large warehouses. Eventually the Bute East Dock was closed in 1970. The railway sidings were removed.

Only after 1980 did redevelopment begin around the disused dock. The Cardiff Bay Development Corporation was set up in the late 1980s to drive regeneration of the Docks area. Atlantic Wharf grew to include housing, new businesses, hotels and the conversion of three large derelict dock warehouses in the close vicinity of Bute East Dock. In 1988 the County Council built a new council headquarters building at Atlantic Wharf to reinforce the regeneration initiatives. It has been described as a "remarkable gesture of faith [by] the South Glamorgan County Council".

A new multiplex cinema and leisure complex was built nearby, known as Atlantic Wharf Leisure Village (now the Red Dragon Centre). Collingdon Road was landscaped and redeveloped to form a mile-long boulevard to Cardiff Bay. Work was completed in 2000 and the road was renamed Lloyd George Avenue.

21st century
With approximately 1500 houses and flats and no representative of its own on Cardiff Council, in 2016 the Atlantic Wharf Residents’ Association demanded that Atlantic Wharf be made into a separate electoral ward.

'Little Ireland'
The district of Newtown was constructed on the initiative of the Marquess of Bute in the mid-1800s to provide housing for the labourers who were building the new docks. The area consisted of six streets in the far north edge of what is now Atlantic Wharf. The streets were occupied mainly by Irish immigrants from Cork. Over 100 years after its creation, the buildings of Newtown were subject to compulsory purchase and were demolished in 1970 for redevelopment. The area eventually became an industrial estate next to the mainline railway.

Notable buildings

 The Bonded Warehouse - Built in 1861 at the head of Bute East Dock using a frame of cast iron columns, in classical proportions. Grade II listed. Now converted into offices for an architecture practice.
 Spillers & Bakers building (Schooner Way) - Mill and warehouse building constructed by milling company Spillers in 1887. Grade II listed. Now converted into luxury apartments.
 County Hall (Atlantic Wharf) - Headquarters of Cardiff Council, built 1988.
 Red Dragon Centre (Hemingway Road) - Leisure complex including a 12-screen cinema, bowling alley and restaurants.
 The quayside crane, built in 1933 by Messrs. Stothert & Pitt Ltd., was built for the Great Western Railway Company and was last used in January 1987.

References

Districts of Cardiff
Butetown
Wharves in the United Kingdom